Punjab House, formerly known as Circuit House, is a mansion and resort building in Murree, Rawalpindi-Islamabad, Pakistan. It has been used by the Government of Punjab, Pakistan, Government of Pakistan for Chief Minister's annexe, for government official meetings, as banquet, and as a state guest house.

History
Punjab House was founded in 1937 as Circuit House. It was further developed when Manzoor Wattoo was Chief Minister of Punjab, Pakistan.

In 2003, it was renamed as Punjab House.

In 2019, it was announced that Punjab House Murree would be converted into a university.

Building
Punjab House has three floors. The top floor is the VVIP floor with master bedroom and suite, the second floor has four executive suites, and the ground floor has a reception hall, two bedrooms and a large waiting lounge.

The master suite has drawing room, walk-in closet, luxury bathroom, balcony and a big kitchen. The foyer of the annexe has most expensive chandelier and the furniture has been provided by top designers in Pakistan. It is centrally air conditioned. It has approximately 100 employees.

References

Buildings and structures in Murree
Official residences in Pakistan
Palaces in Pakistan
State guesthouses
Government of Punjab, Pakistan
1937 establishments in British India